City of the Damned is a Judge Dredd story which was published in British comic 2000 AD in issues 393–406 (1984–1985). It was written by John Wagner and Alan Grant and illustrated by Steve Dillon, Ian Gibson, Ron Smith and Kim Raymond. It was the first Judge Dredd story to feature time travel. Originally planned to last for at least twenty issues (like earlier stories "The Judge Child" and "The Apocalypse War"), the writers ended the series at only 14 issues because they did not like time travel stories.

During publication, four pages of artwork by Steve Dillon were lost, and Dillon had to replace them at short notice. He completed them in time and the relevant episode was published without the story being interrupted. The original pages were found years later and published in prog 610, alongside the new versions so that readers could compare them.

Plot

Premise
The story begins with a prologue set in 2107, which was the present day in the Judge Dredd strip at that time. Scientists have just built the first reliable time machine, called Proteus, which has been successful in short-range tests (journeys of hours or days). Chief Judge McGruder orders Judges Dredd and Anderson to use it to go thirteen years into the future to investigate a prophecy that Mega-City One will be destroyed in the year 2120. This prophecy, made by a dying Psi Judge in 2102, was first mentioned in the earlier story "The Judge Child". It foretells that the city will be destroyed unless Owen Krysler, also known as the "Judge Child", rules the city, since only he can save the city from disaster. In that earlier story, however, Dredd decided that Krysler was too evil to be allowed to rule the city, and left him behind on the planet Xanadu. In 2104 Krysler tried to kill Dredd in revenge, and McGruder ordered his execution. Without the city's prophesied saviour, McGruder now wants to find an alternative solution, and sends Dredd and Anderson to gather intelligence.

2120

In episode one, Dredd and Anderson arrive in the future city. They find the whole place to be deserted and in ruins, having arrived after the predicted catastrophe – whatever it was – happened. Exploring, they eventually find signs of life: an emaciated citizen dressed in rags, who flees in terror on seeing them. In spite of their reassurance that they mean him no harm, the citizen commits suicide rather than be taken alive. The reason why soon becomes apparent when Dredd and Anderson discover that the judges of the future have somehow become vampires who feed on the blood of the public. The two time-travellers readily slaughter dozens of vampire judges, including a vampire Judge Hershey (who normally appeared as Dredd's sidekick in stories at that time).

Dredd retrieves a computer record of events leading up to the disaster. It transpires that the city was conquered by a being with vast psychic powers, known only as 'The Mutant'. All weapons were ineffectual against it. It conjured up monsters which massacred almost everybody; caused buildings to decay and collapse; created phenomena which defied the laws of physics. The whole city was overrun in a matter of minutes. Dredd, Anderson and all of the psi-judges were killed. McGruder and the rest of the judges were turned into vampires and began to prey on the surviving citizenry. A huge cloud of darkness covered the centre of the city, where the Mutant made his lair in the Grand Hall of Justice.

Dredd blinded

Shortly after learning of the city's fate, which occurred months before their arrival, Dredd and Anderson become separated during an attack by a horde of monsters. Dredd is blinded when one of them impales both his eyes with its claws, but he still does not lose his determination to find The Mutant. In one of the most memorable scenes in the history of the strip, the blind and wounded Dredd crawls through every ordeal The Mutant can create for him, until – tortured to the limit of his endurance – he can take no more.

The Mutant then meets Dredd face to face, and it transpires that the tortures to which he subjected Dredd were not intended to kill him, but were only for The Mutant's amusement. Unable to harm him, Dredd asks who he is, as The Mutant's identity is a mystery.

The Mutant reveals himself to be the reincarnation of Owen Krysler, a clone taken from his DNA by the ruler of Xanadu who wanted a psychic of his own. Unexpectedly, the clone had all of the Judge Child's memories, and greatly enhanced power. However something had gone wrong with the cloning process and he no longer had human form, instead having multiple limbs and a misshaped head.

Lamenting the fact that he killed the 2120 Dredd too quickly, the Mutant decides to make up for the wasted opportunity by killing the 2107 Dredd much more slowly. The corpse of the 2120 Dredd is now a mindless undead zombie (unlike the vampire judges encountered earlier), and The Mutant sets it in pursuit of the living Dredd. The Mutant reunites Dredd with Anderson so that she can act as his eyes, and the two try to flee, with the unstoppable zombie in hot pursuit.

The Mutant had believed that there was no way back to the time machine, but Dredd proves him wrong, and Dredd and Anderson manage to escape back to 2107. The zombie comes back with them, but deactivates as soon as they leave 2120. The judges report the destruction of the city to McGruder, who despairs of ever preventing the disaster, since the proof that it has happened is before her eyes.

Dredd's solution
Dredd however is not so willing to accept defeat, and proposes a solution: travel immediately to Xanadu and stop the cloning from taking place. When McGruder observes that there is an inherent danger in altering the course of history, Dredd points out that the danger lies in not altering it. McGruder agrees to the mission, and surgeons fit Dredd with bionic eyes which are superior to the originals. These give Dredd perfect night vision and a 50% reduction in blinking time. Dredd remarks to Anderson that he should have had the operation years earlier.

Dredd and Anderson arrive on Xanadu just in time to witness the rebirth of Owen Krysler. They manage to kill him and also the Grunwalder who created his clone.  However, since the zombie Dredd from 2120 still exists as a museum exhibit, and Dredd still has bionic eyes, they still cannot be sure whether they have succeeded in averting the disaster or not.

Sequels

The zombie Dredd made a reappearance twelve years later when it reanimated and ran amok in "Darkside" by John Smith and Paul Marshall (#1017–1028).
Readers would not learn for thirteen years whether Dredd's plan worked or not, until "In the Year 2120" by John Wagner and Jason Brashill. This single-episode story was 24 pages long and took up an entire issue of 2000 AD (#1077), only the second time this happened in the history of the comic.

Influence on Necropolis
"Necropolis" was not a sequel to "City of the Damned", but some ideas which were first used in the latter sequence were subsequently employed in the more sophisticated "Necropolis". Both stories feature psychic enemies with vast powers, who enslave the judges and use them to kill the citizens. Both include alternative versions of Judge Dredd who serve the enemy, and depict Dredd killing other judges to save the city.

Publication

The story has been reprinted a number of times, including in Judge Dredd: The Complete Case Files vol. 8 (2007) and in volume 74 of Judge Dredd: The Mega Collection (November 2017).

Notes

References
2000 AD's timeline entry for City of the Damned

Comics about time travel